Comas District is one of fifteen districts of the Concepción Province in Peru.

Geography 
The Waytapallana mountain range traverses the province. Other mountains are listed below:

References